The Swiss Indoor Athletics Championships is an annual indoor track and field competition organised by the Swiss Athletics Federation, which serves as the national championship for the sport in Switzerland. Typically held over two to three days in February during the Swiss winter, it was first added to the national calendar in 1982, supplementing the main outdoor Swiss Athletics Championships held in the summer since 1906.

Events
The following athletics events feature as standard on the Swiss Indoor Championships programme:

 Sprint: 60 m, 200 m, 400 m
 Distance track events: 800 m, 1500 m (men only), 3000 m
 Hurdles: 60 m hurdles
 Jumps: long jump, triple jump, high jump, pole vault
 Throws: shot put
 Combined events: heptathlon (men), pentathlon (women)

The men's 3000 metres was dropped from 1990–94. Women's distance events have gone through several changes: the 1500 metres was held from 1982–1989, but has not been held thereafter, being replaced by the 800 metres. The women's 3000 m was added in 2000. The women's field event programme was expanded to include triple jump (1991) and pole vault (1996), bringing the women's field schedule to parity with the men's. Combined events were a late addition to the programme, first appearing in 1996.

Editions

Championships records

Men

Women

References

Editions
Hallen-SM Medaillengewinner ab 1982 . Swiss Athletics. Retrieved 2019-07-14.

External links
Swiss Athletics official website

 
Athletics competitions in Switzerland
National indoor athletics competitions
Recurring sporting events established in 1982
1982 establishments in Switzerland
February sporting events
Athletics Indoor